John Muldoon (11 July 1865 – 21 November 1938) was an Irish  barrister and nationalist politician. He was a Member of Parliament (MP) for most of the period between 1905 and 1918, representing three different constituencies in the House of Commons of the United Kingdom of Great Britain and Ireland.

Early life
Muldoon was the third son of James Muldoon of Dromore, County Tyrone, and of Catherine Gahan. He was educated at a local school, at Queen's College, Galway and at the King's Inns. He was called to the Irish Bar in 1894 and became a King's Counsel (KC) in 1913. In 1903 he married Olive, daughter of Charles Whamond of Westport, County Mayo.

Political career
Muldoon was a treasurer of the United Irish League and a Director of the Freeman's Journal.  He was returned unopposed as MP for the Irish Parliamentary Party in North Donegal at a by-election in June 1905 but did not stand again at the general election of January 1906, being deselected by the local clergy.  In July 1907 he was elected unopposed at a by-election for East Wicklow, and was re-elected at both general elections of 1910, unopposed in January 1910 and by almost two to one over a Unionist in the December 1910 election.  In July 1911 he resigned and stood for the East Cork seat of fellow Nationalist Captain A. J. C. Donelan, who had been unseated following an election petition, having defeated William O'Brien the previous December.  Donelan succeeded Muldoon unopposed in East Wicklow, while Muldoon was in the event returned unopposed in East Cork.

Muldoon was politically very active from 1900 to 1914.  His particular interests were the Local Government (Ireland) Act 1898, the Land Acts and the Labourers (Ireland) Act 1906, on all of which he published a number of works.  He was a close political confidant of John Dillon, while said to be close to John Redmond and Joseph Devlin.

Muldoon retired from politics at the general election of 1918.  In 1921 he was appointed Registrar in Lunacy and five years later, after the establishment of the Irish Free State, as Registrar in the office of the Chief Justice of Ireland, retiring in 1935.

Notes

Sources

 Dod's Parliamentary Companion, 1912
 Ferguson,Kenneth (ed.), King's Inns Barristers, 1868–2004, Dublin, Honorable Society of King's Inns in association with the Irish Legal History Society, 2005
 Irish Times, Obituary of John Muldoon K.C., 22 November 1938
 Maume, Patrick, The Long Gestation:  Irish Nationalist Life 1891-1918, Dublin, Gill & MacMillan, 1999
 Walker, Brian M. (ed.), Parliamentary Election Results in Ireland, 1801-1922, Dublin, Royal Irish Academy, 1978

Publications
 A Guide to Irish Local Government, (with George McSweeny), Dublin, Eason & Son, 1898
 Local Government Rules and Orders, Dublin, Eason & Son, 1899
 A Guide to the Election of County and Rural District Councillors in Ireland, Dublin, Eason & Son, 1902
 Old Age Pensions in Ireland, Dublin, Eason & Co., 1908
 For Ireland's Sake;  or, Under the Green Flag, A romantic Irish drama, Dublin, E. Ponsonby, 1910
 The Story of a "Rigged Convention", Dublin, 1915

External links
 
 

1865 births
1938 deaths
Irish barristers
Male non-fiction writers from Northern Ireland
Irish Parliamentary Party MPs
Members of the Parliament of the United Kingdom for County Cork constituencies (1801–1922)
Members of the Parliament of the United Kingdom for County Donegal constituencies (1801–1922)
Members of the Parliament of the United Kingdom for County Wicklow constituencies (1801–1922)
Politicians from County Tyrone
UK MPs 1900–1906
UK MPs 1906–1910
UK MPs 1910
UK MPs 1910–1918